The Thunder Bay Catholic District School Board (known as English-language Separate District School Board No. 34A prior to 1999) oversees all Catholic schools in the Thunder Bay CMA and the townships of Gorham and Ware in Ontario, Canada.  It administers education at 15 elementary schools, 3 senior elementary, and 2 secondary schools.

 K-6 Schools
Corpus Christi
Holy Cross
Holy Family
Our Lady Of Charity
St. Ann
St. Bernard (French Immersion)
St. Elizabeth
St. Francis
St. Jude
St. Margaret
St. Martin (French Immersion)
St. Paul
St. Pius X
St. Thomas Aquinas
St. Vincent

7/8 Schools
Bishop E. Q. Jennings
Bishop Gallagher (French Immersion)
Pope John Paul II

 High Schools
St. Ignatius (French Immersion)
St. Patrick (Offers French Immersion courses)

See also 

Education in Thunder Bay, Ontario
Lakehead District School Board
Conseil scolaire de district catholique des Aurores boréales
List of school districts in Ontario
List of high schools in Ontario

References

External links
 Thunder Bay District Catholic School Board

Education in Thunder Bay
Roman Catholic school districts in Ontario